Kevin Luke "Cub" Swanson (born November 2, 1983) is an American professional mixed martial artist. He currently competes in the Bantamweight division in the Ultimate Fighting Championship (UFC). A professional since 2004, Swanson holds the most post-fight bonus awards in division history with eight, including his WEC tenure he has been awarded "Fight of the Night" honors ten times.

Background
Swanson was born and raised mostly in Palm Springs, California, on November 2, 1983. He had a Swedish father and a Mexican mother. His widely used nickname Cub originates from his early childhood, as his brother could not say Swanson's real name and opted to call him Cub. Swanson has two older brothers Steve and Aaron, and two sisters of which one has Down syndrome. Swanson's father died of melanoma three months after he was born. Because of his mother's heavy grieving and subsequent drug addiction, Swanson and his siblings were then adopted and raised by their father's cousin. The adoptive family was religious so Swanson spent most of his early life in church. Swanson was also homeschooled for most of his young life. Swanson started playing soccer at the age of four, dreaming of a professional career and playing in the World Cup. He and his oldest brother Steve succeeded well in soccer, winning the majority of the AYSO tournaments they attended in their age divisions.

Eventually, when Swanson was 14, his adoptive parents divorced and he returned to his mother who at the time had recovered from the addiction. Swanson then attended Cathedral City High School, along with future boxer Timothy Bradley. At the time, Swanson associated himself with local gangs and participated in many streets fights. He also drank alcohol and took recreational drugs. The police arrested Swanson and two of his friends for committing a house robbery. As a result, Swanson was placed in a juvenile detention center. He was released when he was 17 years old. At the age of 19, Swanson started working for United Cerebral Palsy, where he helped children with disabilities. UFC fighter Joe Stevenson invited Swanson to train with him, which he accepted. This marked Swanson's transition into professional MMA.

Mixed martial arts career

Early career
On July 25, 2004, Swanson made his first professional fight. MMA was not sanctioned in California in 2004, so Swanson competed at Total Combat in Mexico. His opponent, Shannon Gugerty, submitted Swanson via Rear-Naked Choke. The fight lasted for just 30 seconds. Despite the loss, Swanson continued to compete in professional MMA fights. Swanson won nine fights before entering the WEC in 2007. This included a rematch with Gugerty in 2006. Other than TC, Swanson also competed in KOTC and BIB.

World Extreme Cagefighting

2007
On his WEC debut on March 24, 2007, Swanson submitted Tommy Lee by guillotine choke. Swanson earned a disclosed pay of $6000. He next defeated Micah Miller at WEC 28 via unanimous decision. Swanson was scheduled to fight Jens Pulver in Pulvers 145lb debut, the fight was pushed back three months when Pulver sustained an injury in training camp; Swanson accused Pulver of trying to duck the fight, which Pulver denied.  They finally met at WEC 31, with Swanson losing via guillotine choke. The fight only lasted 35 seconds and marked the end of Swanson's eleven-fight winning streak.

2008
Hiroyuki Takaya took on Swanson on December 3, 2008, at WEC 37. Swanson won via unanimous decision. Both fighters earned the Fight of the Night honors. This was Swanson's first official WEC award.

2009
WEC schedule Swanson to fight Diego Nunes on April 5, 2009, at WEC 40. Nunes withdrew from the fight days before the bout due to a hand injury.

Swanson fought with José Aldo at WEC 41 on June 7. Just 8 seconds into the first round, Swanson lost by TKO via a double flying knee. Nevertheless, WEC gave Swanson a disclosed pay of $8940 Base.

Swanson defeated John Franchi via submission on November 18 at WEC 44. The fight earned Swanson his second Fight of the Night honor. In his bout against Franchi, Swanson broke both of his hands.

2010
WEC scheduled Swanson to fight WEC newcomer Chan Sung Jung. Swanson withdrew from the card with an injury. He would be replaced by Leonard Garcia.

On August 18, 2010, WEC 50, Swanson faced Chad Mendes. Mendes came from a wrestling background. He took Swanson down multiple times throughout the fight. Swanson lost via unanimous decision.

Swanson faced Mackens Semerzier next on November 11 at WEC 52. He won the fight via split decision. The bout was an exciting back and forth affair that earned both fighters Fight of the Night honors.

2011 
On October 28, 2011, WEC merged with Ultimate Fighting Championship. As part of the merger, most WEC fighter contracts transferred to UFC.

Ultimate Fighting Championship

2011
Swanson was expected to face Erik Koch on March 3, 2011, at UFC Live: Sanchez vs. Kampmann. However, Swanson pulled out of the bout due to an injury. Swanson vs. Koch was rescheduled to take place on July 2 at UFC 132. However, Swanson was forced out of the bout with another injury.

After just over a year out of action, Swanson returned to face Ricardo Lamas on November 12 at UFC on Fox 1. Swanson was the last WEC fighter imported from the WEC/UFC merger to debut in the UFC. He lost the fight via submission (arm-triangle choke) in the second round.

2012

In his second UFC fight, Swanson faced George Roop on January 28, 2012, at UFC on Fox: Evans vs. Davis. Prior the fight, Swanson said "I just really want to smash this kid". He boasted "I'm the more complete fighter and I have the tools to shut him down". Swanson won the fight via TKO in the second round.

Ross Pearson and Swanson went head-to-head on June 22 at UFC on FX 4.  Swanson won the fight via TKO in the second round, earning him Knockout of the Night bonus. Swanson fought Charles Oliveira as an underdog on September 22 at UFC 152. Swanson won the fight by knockout in the first round. Swanson received a Knockout of the Night bonus.

2013
Swanson was expected to face Dennis Siver on February 16, 2013, at UFC on Fuel TV: Barão vs. McDonald. However, Siver pulled out of the bout. Dustin Poirier took Siver's spot. Swanson won by unanimous decision. As of March 2013, Swanson was ranked the #10 Featherweight in the world by Sherdog and ranked #5 within the UFC. Swanson's bout with Dennis Siver was rescheduled for July 6, 2013, at UFC 162, as the first fight of his new five-fight contract. Swanson won via TKO in the third round. The performance earned both participants Fight of the Night honors.

2014
Swanson challenged Jeremy Stephens on June 28 at UFC Fight Night 44. Swanson won via unanimous decision. The performance earned both participants Fight of the Night honors.

Swanson next faced Frankie Edgar on November 22 at UFC Fight Night 57. Prior the fight, UFC president Dana White promised that "If Cub Swanson wins this fight, we did tell him we would give him a title shot."  "All I know is that," Swanson told Sherdog.com, "in my mind, I finish Frankie Edgar, that I'm getting that title shot. That's all that's on my mind.". Swanson lost the one-sided fight via submission in closing seconds of the fifth round.

2015
Max Holloway challenged Swanson on April 18, 2015, at UFC on Fox 15. Swanson was out-struck in the first two rounds. Holloway then set up a guillotine choke in the third round, forcing Swanson to tap out. Following the fight, Swanson announced via Twitter that he had suffered a broken jaw and a broken right hand. The two-loss-streak made Swanson drop out as a title contender. "It's really hard to explain," said Swanson in an interview, "You want something so bad and it may come and it may not, you can go crazy doing all of that."

2016
At his #10 UFC fight, Swanson faced Hacran Dias on April 16, 2016, at UFC on Fox 19. Swanson won the fight via unanimous decision.

Swanson faced Tatsuya Kawajiri on August 6 at UFC Fight Night 92. "I've been around forever, he's been around forever, so we're both just looking for a win," said Swanson in an interview. During the fight, Swanson kneed Kawajiri to the head, which was illegal since Kawajiri was downed at the time. Referee John McCarthy paused the fight shortly but no points are deducted from Swanson. Swanson won the back and forth fight via unanimous decision.

Swanson fought with touted prospect Choi Doo-ho on December 10, 2016, at UFC 206. Swanson won the fight via unanimous decision. "I knew he (Choi) deserved the hype," said Swanson during the post-fight interview, "but he made a mistake calling me out. I wanted to prove to everyone that I've still got it. Don't write me off again." Both participants were awarded Fight of the Night and later was awarded Fight of the Year at the World MMA Awards. During UFC 273 broadcast in April 2022 it was announced that the fight will be inducted to the UFC Hall of Fame Fight Wing class of 2022.

2017
Underdog Artem Lobov challenged Swanson to a fight on April 22, 2017, at UFC Fight Night 108. Swanson won the fight via unanimous decision . The fight broke the record for most significant strikes landed (209) in a UFC Featherweight bout and in a UFC Fight Night. It also came #4 in most significant strikes landed in a single bout. Subsequently, both participants were awarded a Fight of the Night awards. This was Swanson's sixth Fight of the Night bonus. He broke his hand for the 10th time in his career.

Swanson faced Brian Ortega on December 9, 2017, at UFC Fight Night 123. He lost the fight via submission in the second round. Despite the loss, Swanson earned his third consecutive (and fifth overall) Fight of the Night bonus award. The fight with Ortega also marked the last bout of his contract and albeit taking offers from a variety of promotions, he decided to re-sign with the UFC due to consistent drug testing by USADA.

2018
Swanson faced Frankie Edgar in a rematch on April 21, 2018, at UFC Fight Night 128. He lost the fight via unanimous decision.

Swanson faced Renato Moicano on August 4, 2018, at UFC 227. He lost the fight via a rear-naked choke submission in the first round.

2019
Swanson faced Shane Burgos on May 4, 2019, at UFC Fight Night 151. He lost the fight by split decision.

Swanson faced Kron Gracie on October 12, 2019, at UFC on ESPN+ 19. The days leading to the bout saw a media clash between the fighters, as Swanson claimed several Brazilian jiu-jitsu gyms had refused him entry after learning he was going to fight a member of the Gracie family, to which Gracie answered supporting those views and criticizing Swanson's work ethic. Swanson won the fight via unanimous decision.  This win earned him the Fight of the Night bonus award.

On December 12, 2019, Swanson competed at Quintet Ultra as part of Team WEC. In his bout with Jake Shields he tore his ACL, meniscus in his left knee. Swanson stated UFC paid his medical costs.

2020
Swanson faced Daniel Pineda on December 12, 2020, at UFC 256. He won the fight via knockout in the second round, marking his first finish since July 2013.

2021
Swanson was briefly linked to a bout against Gavin Tucker on May 1, 2021, at UFC on ESPN: Reyes vs. Procházka. However, Tucker was tabbed as a short notice replacement to face Dan Ige at UFC Fight Night: Edwards vs. Muhammad instead. Swanson instead faced Giga Chikadze. He lost the fight via TKO in the first round.

Swanson faced Darren Elkins on December 18, 2021, at UFC Fight Night: Lewis vs. Daukaus. He won the bout via TKO in the first round. This win earned him the Performance of the Night bonus award. Having one bout left in his prevailing contract, Swanson signed a new four-fight contract following the bout.

2022
Swanson faced Jonathan Martinez in Swanson's bantamweight debut on October 15, 2022 at UFC Fight Night 212. He lost the fight via technical knockout in round two.

Fighting style
Many MMA media outlets say that Cub Swanson is one of the most entertaining MMA fighters. MMA junkie reported "Swanson is a man who will give you a gritty, exciting fight". Bloodyelbow.com comments "Cub's style tends to be wild, unpredictable, and very explosive". Swanson has 10 fight night bonuses for UFC/WEC featherweight bouts. This is the highest in combined divisional history. MMAfighting.com calls Swanson "an exciting fighter". MMA fans call Swanson's style "Beautiful Destruction" 

Swanson is known for his creative striking. Many pundits cite Swanson's ducking roundhouse kick / cartwheel kick to the head as his most distinct move. Swanson often sets up with a left hook, then follow up with a ducking roundhouse kick to the head. This combination was used against Artem Lobov. In other cases, Swanson would throw a single ducking roundhouse kick with no set up, like in his fight with Ross Pearson and Doo Ho Choi.

Swanson's movements are very unorthodox. He tends to feint while punching, as exemplified in WEC 52. Swanson often switches stance after kicking, something which he did against Dennis Siver. He also puts a lot of weight into his punches. Weight shifts give him more power but shift him off balance. This makes Swanson susceptible to take-downs and counters.  Similarly, Swanson's stance switches make him vulnerable to leg kicks. Low kicks tend to disrupt his footwork.

In his fight with Doo Ho Choi and Dennis Siver, Swanson escaped from inferior positions. Despite this, 7 out of Swanson's 11 losses are by submission however since these losses he was highly praised for his takedown defence against world class jiu-jitsu fighter Kron Gracie at UFC Fight Night: Joanna vs. Waterson in 2019. Swanson stated on his UFC profile that Superman double wrist lock is his favorite move.

Swanson stated that Bruce Lee inspired him as a fighter.

Training 
Swanson began training MMA in 2003. His typical workout routine involves striking in the morning and cardio exercises in the afternoon. Grappling sessions take place at night. Brazilian Jiu-Jitsu medalist Rigan Machado coaches Swanson's BJJ. Former boxing champion Joel Díaz teaches Swanson boxing.

Coaching
Cub Swanson owns an MMA gym, Tru MMA, in Indio, California.

Swanson also co-owns a UFC Gym in Costa Mesa with Michael Bisping. Swanson taught intermediate MMA classes at the UFC Gym on May 10, 2017. Classes included Boxing, kickboxing and Brazilian Jiu-Jitsu. "As a native of Southern California," remarked Swanson on the UFC website, "I look forward to bringing this community, which is both near and dear to my heart, a myriad of amazing amenities and programs to help them TRAIN different and live a healthier lifestyle." Eventually, Swanson started attending training camps over at his own gym.

Personal life
Swanson married Kenda Perez on June 1, 2018. The two had their first child, Royal Rae Swanson, on August 21, 2017. Their identical twin sons, Saint Cub Swanson and King Cub Swanson, were born on September 2, 2018.

Steve Swanson, Cub Swanson's older brother, also competes in MMA. The two brothers train in and run their MMA gym Tru Gym together.

In his spare time, Swanson plays golf near his hometown at Indio, California. Golf club design enterprise PowerBilt sponsors Swanson.

Filmography

Television

Video games

Championships & accomplishments

Mixed martial arts
 Ultimate Fighting Championship
 Performance of the Night (One time) 
 Fight of the Night (Six times) vs. Dennis Siver, Jeremy Stephens, Doo Ho Choi, Artem Lobov, Brian Ortega, and Kron Gracie 
 Knockout of the Night (Two times) vs. Ross Pearson and Charles Oliveira 
 Tied (Max Holloway & Yair Rodriguez) for most post-fight bonuses in UFC Featherweight division history (9)
2016 Fight of the Year vs. Doo Ho Choi
UFC Hall of Fame (Fight Wing) vs. 
 World Extreme Cagefighting
 Fight of the Night (Four times) vs. Micah Miller, Hiroyuki Takaya, John Franchi, and Mackens Semerzier 
 MMAJunkie.com
 2014 June Fight of the Month vs. Jeremy Stephens
 ESPN
 2016 Fight of the Year vs. Doo Ho Choi
 World MMA Awards
 2016 Fight of the Year vs. Doo Ho Choi at UFC 206
 Sherdog
 2012 All-Violence First Team
MMADNA.nl
2016 Fight of the Year vs. Choi Doo-ho
MMA Mania
2016 Fight of the Year vs. Doo Ho Choi
CBS Sports
2016 Fight of the Year vs. Doo Ho Choi

Mixed martial arts record

|-
|Loss
|align=center|28–13
|Jonathan Martinez
|TKO (leg kick)
|UFC Fight Night: Grasso vs. Araújo
|
|align=center|2
|align=center|4:19
|Las Vegas, Nevada, United States
|
|-
|Win
|align=center|28–12
|Darren Elkins
|TKO (spinning wheel kick and punches)
|UFC Fight Night: Lewis vs. Daukaus
|
|align=center|1
|align=center|2:12
|Las Vegas, Nevada, United States
|
|-
|Loss
|align=center|27–12
|Giga Chikadze
|TKO (body kick and punches)
|UFC on ESPN: Reyes vs. Procházka 
|
|align=center|1
|align=center|1:03
|Las Vegas, Nevada, United States
|
|-
|Win
|align=center|27–11
|Daniel Pineda
|KO (punches)
|UFC 256
|
|align=center|2
|align=center|1:52
|Las Vegas, Nevada, United States
|
|-
|Win
|align=center|26–11
|Kron Gracie
|Decision (unanimous)
|UFC Fight Night: Joanna vs. Waterson 
|
|align=center|3
|align=center|5:00
|Tampa, Florida, United States
|
|-
|Loss
|align=center|25–11
|Shane Burgos
|Decision (split)
|UFC Fight Night: Iaquinta vs. Cowboy 
|
|align=center|3
|align=center|5:00
|Ottawa, Ontario, Canada
|  
|-
|Loss
|align=center|25–10
|Renato Moicano
|Submission (rear-naked choke)
|UFC 227 
|
|align=center|1
|align=center|4:15
|Los Angeles, California, United States
|
|- 
|Loss
|align=center|25–9
|Frankie Edgar
|Decision (unanimous)
|UFC Fight Night: Barboza vs. Lee
|
|align=center|3
|align=center|5:00
|Atlantic City, New Jersey, United States
|
|-
|Loss
|align=center|25–8
|Brian Ortega
|Submission (guillotine choke)
|UFC Fight Night: Swanson vs. Ortega
|
|align=center|2
|align=center|3:22
|Fresno, California, United States
|
|-
|Win
|align=center|25–7
|Artem Lobov
|Decision (unanimous)
|UFC Fight Night: Swanson vs. Lobov
|
|align=center|5
|align=center|5:00
|Nashville, Tennessee, United States
|
|-
|Win
|align=center|24–7
|Doo Ho Choi
|Decision (unanimous)
|UFC 206
|
|align=center|3
|align=center|5:00
|Toronto, Ontario, Canada
|
|-
|Win
|align=center|23–7
|Tatsuya Kawajiri
|Decision (unanimous)
|UFC Fight Night: Rodríguez vs. Caceres
|
|align=center|3
|align=center|5:00
|Salt Lake City, Utah, United States
|
|-
| Win
| align=center|22–7
| Hacran Dias
| Decision (unanimous)
| UFC on Fox: Teixeira vs. Evans
| 
| align=center|3
| align=center|5:00
| Tampa, Florida, United States
|
|-
| Loss
| align=center|21–7
| Max Holloway
| Submission (guillotine choke)
| UFC on Fox: Machida vs. Rockhold
| 
| align=center|3
| align=center|3:58
| Newark, New Jersey, United States
|
|-
| Loss
| align=center| 21–6
| Frankie Edgar
| Submission (neck crank)
| UFC Fight Night: Edgar vs. Swanson
| 
| align=center| 5
| align=center| 4:56
| Austin, Texas, United States
|
|-
| Win
| align=center| 21–5
| Jeremy Stephens
| Decision (unanimous)
| UFC Fight Night: Swanson vs. Stephens
| 
| align=center| 5
| align=center| 5:00
| San Antonio, Texas, United States
| 
|-
| Win
| align=center| 20–5
| Dennis Siver
| KO (punches)
| UFC 162
| 
| align=center| 3
| align=center| 2:24
| Las Vegas, Nevada, United States
| 
|-
| Win
| align=center| 19–5
| Dustin Poirier
| Decision (unanimous)
| UFC on Fuel TV: Barão vs. McDonald
| 
| align=center| 3
| align=center| 5:00
| London, England
|
|-
| Win
| align=center| 18–5
| Charles Oliveira
| KO (punch)
| UFC 152
| 
| align=center| 1
| align=center| 2:40
| Toronto, Ontario, Canada
| 
|-
| Win
| align=center| 17–5
| Ross Pearson
| TKO (punches)
| UFC on FX: Maynard vs. Guida
| 
| align=center| 2
| align=center| 4:14
| Atlantic City, New Jersey, United States
| 
|-
| Win
| align=center| 16–5
| George Roop
| TKO (punches)
| UFC on Fox: Evans vs. Davis
| 
| align=center| 2
| align=center| 2:22
| Chicago, Illinois, United States
|
|-
| Loss
| align=center| 15–5
| Ricardo Lamas
| Submission (arm-triangle choke)
| UFC on Fox: Velasquez vs. dos Santos
| 
| align=center| 2
| align=center| 2:16
| Anaheim, California, United States
|
|-
| Win
| align=center| 15–4
| Mackens Semerzier
| Decision (split)
| WEC 52
| 
| align=center| 3
| align=center| 5:00
| Las Vegas, Nevada, United States
| 
|-
| Loss
| align=center| 14–4
| Chad Mendes
| Decision (unanimous)
| WEC 50
| 
| align=center| 3
| align=center| 5:00
| Las Vegas, Nevada, United States
|
|-
| Win
| align=center| 14–3
| John Franchi
| Submission (guillotine choke)
| WEC 44
| 
| align=center| 3
| align=center| 4:50
| Las Vegas, Nevada, United States
| 
|-
| Loss
| align=center| 13–3
| José Aldo
| TKO (flying knee and punches)
| WEC 41
| 
| align=center| 1
| align=center| 0:08
| Sacramento, California, United States
|
|-
| Win
| align=center| 13–2
| Hiroyuki Takaya
| Decision (unanimous)
| WEC 37
| 
| align=center| 3
| align=center| 5:00
| Las Vegas, Nevada, United States
| 
|-
| Win
| align=center| 12–2
| Donny Walker
| Submission (rear-naked choke)
| IFBL 11
| 
| align=center| 3
| align=center| 1:24
| Niles, Ohio, United States
|
|-
| Loss
| align=center| 11–2
| Jens Pulver
| Submission (guillotine choke)
| WEC 31
| 
| align=center| 1
| align=center| 0:35
| Las Vegas, Nevada, United States
|
|-
| Win
| align=center| 11–1
| Micah Miller
| Decision (unanimous)
| WEC 28
| 
| align=center| 3
| align=center| 5:00
| Las Vegas, Nevada, United States
|
|-
| Win
| align=center| 10–1
| Tommy Lee
| Submission (guillotine choke)
| WEC 26
| 
| align=center| 1
| align=center| 3:17
| Las Vegas, Nevada, United States
|
|-
| Win
| align=center| 9–1
| Chuck Kim
| KO (punch)
| BIB
| 
| align=center| 1
| align=center| 4:51
| Bakersfield, California, United States
|
|-
| Win
| align=center| 8–1
| Charlie Valencia
| TKO (punches)
| KOTC: BOOYAA
| 
| align=center| 1
| align=center| 4:52
| San Jacinto, California, United States
|
|-
| Win
| align=center| 7–1
| Richard Montano
| Decision (unanimous)
| KOTC: Rapid Fire
| 
| align=center| 2
| align=center| 5:00
| San Jacinto, California, United States
| 
|-
| Win
| align=center| 6–1
| Shannon Gugerty
| TKO (punches)
| TC 13
| 
| align=center| 2
| align=center| 3:40
| Del Mar, California, United States
|
|-
| Win
| align=center| 5–1
| Fernando Arreola
| TKO (submission to punches)
| KOTC 63: Final Conflict
| 
| align=center| 1
| align=center| 3:21
| San Jacinto, California, United States
|
|-
| Win
| align=center| 4–1
| Mike Corey
| TKO (doctor stoppage)
| KOTC 61: Flash Point
| 
| align=center| 2
| align=center| 2:42
| San Jacinto, California, United States
|
|-
| Win
| align=center| 3–1
| Armando Sanchez
| TKO (submission to punches)
| KOTC 58: Prime Time
| 
| align=center| 1
| align=center| 1:59
| San Jacinto, California, United States
|
|-
| Win
| align=center| 2–1
| Martin Bautista
| Submission (rear-naked choke)
| Total Combat 7
| 
| align=center| 2
| align=center| N/A
| Tijuana, Mexico
|
|-
| Win
| align=center| 1–1
| Joe Morales
| TKO (submission to punches)
| Total Combat 6
| 
| align=center| 1
| align=center| 2:28
| Tijuana, Mexico
|
|-
| Loss
| align=center| 0–1
| Shannon Gugerty
| Submission (rear-naked choke)
| Total Combat 4
| 
| align=center| 1
| align=center| 0:15
| Tijuana, Mexico
|
|-

See also
 List of current UFC fighters
 List of male mixed martial artists

References

External links

 
 

1983 births
Living people
American male mixed martial artists
American practitioners of Brazilian jiu-jitsu
American male judoka
People awarded a black belt in Brazilian jiu-jitsu
Mixed martial artists utilizing judo
Mixed martial artists utilizing Brazilian jiu-jitsu
Featherweight mixed martial artists
Mixed martial artists from California
Sportspeople from Palm Springs, California
American mixed martial artists of Mexican descent
American people of Swedish descent
Ultimate Fighting Championship male fighters